Berkant Göktan (born 12 December 1980) is a Turkish-German former footballer. He was considered one of the hottest prospects in Germany during the late 1990s.

Club career
Göktan was born in Munich. Giovanni Trapattoni called him up to train with Bayern's senior squad when he was 16 years old, while Ottmar Hitzfeld granted him his professional debut at age 17. He replaced Hasan Salihamidžić in a 1998–99 UEFA Champions League game against Manchester United with 30 minutes left when the score was 2–1 for Manchester. Bayern ended up tying the game.

In January 1999, he negotiated a loan deal to Borussia Mönchengladbach.

In September 2006, Göktan joined TSV 1860 Munich in the Bundesliga and became a star of the team. On 21 October 2008, he was released from his contract after being positively tested for cocaine consumption.

On 21 January 2010, he has signed a one-year contract with Thai Premier League champions Muangthong United who were hoping to qualify for their first ever AFC Champions League. Göktan was the club's first signing under new coach René Desaeyere. He left the club without featuring in a single match because of fitness.

Personal life
Göktan is a Beşiktaş fan.

Honours
Bayern Munich
 Bundesliga: 2000–01

Galatasaray
 Süper Lig: 2001–02

References

External links

 
 

Living people
1980 births
German people of Turkish descent
Association football forwards
German footballers
Turkish footballers
FC Bayern Munich footballers
FC Bayern Munich II players
Borussia Mönchengladbach players
Arminia Bielefeld players
1. FC Kaiserslautern players
TSV 1860 Munich players
Berkant Goktan
Beşiktaş J.K. footballers
Galatasaray S.K. footballers
Footballers from Munich
Bundesliga players
2. Bundesliga players
Süper Lig players
Expatriate footballers in Thailand
SV Heimstetten players